Ametor latus is a species of water scavenger beetle in the family Hydrophilidae. It is found in North America.

References

Further reading

 

Hydrophilinae
Articles created by Qbugbot
Beetles described in 1873